In mathematics, a Frink ideal, introduced by Orrin Frink, is a certain kind of subset of a partially ordered set.

Basic definitions 
LU(A) is the set of all common lower bounds of the set of all common upper bounds of the subset A of a partially ordered set.

A  subset I of a partially ordered set (P, ≤) is a Frink ideal, if the following condition holds:

For every finite subset S of I, we have LU(S)  I.

A  subset I of a partially ordered set (P, ≤) is a normal ideal or a cut if LU(I)  I.

Remarks
Every Frink ideal I is a lower set.
A subset I of a lattice (P, ≤) is a  Frink ideal if and only if it is a lower set that is closed under finite joins (suprema).
 Every normal ideal is a Frink ideal.

Related notions
pseudoideal
Doyle pseudoideal

References

Order theory